Helvetia Rugby is a Spanish rugby team based in Seville. The team's name is derived from the insurance company Helvetia that is their main sponsor.

Season to season

8 seasons in División de Honor B

External links
Official website

Spanish rugby union teams
Sport in Seville
Rugby clubs established in 2007
Sports teams in Andalusia